Carlo Gerosa (born 30 November 1964) is an Italian former alpine skier who competed in the 1988 Winter Olympics and 1992 Winter Olympics, sisteen-time in top ten in World Cup races.

World Cup results
Top 10

References

External links
 

1964 births
Living people
Italian male alpine skiers
Olympic alpine skiers of Italy
Alpine skiers at the 1988 Winter Olympics
Alpine skiers at the 1992 Winter Olympics
Universiade medalists in alpine skiing
Universiade bronze medalists for Italy
Competitors at the 1985 Winter Universiade
Alpine skiers of Centro Sportivo Carabinieri